Jonathan Calleri (born 23 September 1993) is an Argentine professional footballer who plays as a striker for Brazilian club São Paulo.

Calleri started his career at All Boys and played for Boca Juniors for one season before signing for Deportivo Maldonado. A series of loans have since ensued, firstly to Brasileirão club São Paulo, then to Europe with West Ham United of the Premier League, and La Liga clubs Las Palmas, Alavés and RCD Espanyol. After this period of loans to european clubs, he returned to South America, rejoining São Paulo.

Club career

All Boys
On 14 August 2013, Calleri debuted for All Boys against Estudiantes in the quarterfinals of 2012–13 Copa Argentina. He made his league debut on 7 September, against Argentinos Juniors, and played his first full game in his team's defeat against Godoy Cruz on 7 October.

Boca Juniors
In July 2014, Calleri signed for Boca Juniors, with coach Carlos Bianchi deciding to take-up the right that the club had with the player, a holding of 30% of the player' rights.

On 27 July 2014, Calleri made his Boca debut in a 2–0 loss to Huracan. In the league, his debut came on 18 August as a substitute in a 1–0 win over Belgrano, and a week later coach Rodolfo Arruabarrena started Calleri for the first time in a 3–0 loss to Atlético Rafaela.

On 1 November 2015, Boca Juniors were crowned champions of the Argentine Primera División, in which Calleri scored 10 goals in 26 matches and achieved his first title as a professional player. Three days later, Boca Juniors won the 2014–15 Copa Argentina.

Deportivo Maldonado
In January 2016, Calleri joined Uruguayan club Deportivo Maldonado. In an arrangement similar to a number of other players that have been registered to the club, he was loaned to Campeonato Brasileiro Série A club São Paulo FC in the same month.

São Paulo (loan)
On 3 February 2016, Calleri made his debut and scored his first goal for São Paulo as they drew 1–1 with Universidad César Vallejo in the 2016 edition of Copa Libertadores.

On 13 July 2016, Calleri played his last match for São Paulo in a game they lost 1–2 against Atlético Nacional, in the Libertadores semifinals. He scored the only goal for São Paulo, in the 9th minute. Calleri said that it was his last game for the club and that he had "spent very beautiful six months" playing for Brazilian side. He ended the tournament as the top goalscorer, with 9 goals in 12 matches. That year, Calleri scored a total amount of 16 goals in 31 matches played.

West Ham United (loan)
In August, West Ham United signed Calleri on a season-long loan. He made his Premier League debut coming off the bench in the match against Bournemouth on 21 August 2016. His only goal for the club came in the 94th minute in a 3–1 win against Middlesbrough at the Riverside Stadium on 21 January 2017. His full Premier League debut finally came on 22 April 2017 in a 0–0 draw with Everton at the London Stadium. He played 61 minutes before being replaced by Diafra Sakho. After 19 appearances with one goal scored, Calleri's loan ended.

Las Palmas (loan)
On 11 July 2017, Calleri joined La Liga side UD Las Palmas on a one-year loan deal. He made his debut for the club on 18 August, starting in a 0–1 away loss against Valencia CF, and scored his first goal seven days later but in a 1–5 home loss against Atlético Madrid.

Alavés (loan)
On 22 August 2018, Calleri was loaned to fellow La Liga side Deportivo Alavés for one year.

Espanyol (loan)
On 26 August 2019, joined RCD Espanyol on a season-long loan deal.

Calleri scored a hat-trick for Espanyol in a Europa League match against Wolverhampton Wanderers on 27 February 2020; Espanyol won the match 3–2 but lost the two-legged tie by a score of 6–3.

Osasuna (loan)
On 13 September 2020, Calleri joined another La Liga club, this time joining Osasuna on a season-long loan deal.

São Paulo (second loan spell)
On 30 August 2021, Calleri returned to South America after 5 years in Europe, rejoining São Paulo on a 16 month-long loan deal.

São Paulo
On 25 July 2022, São Paulo announced they have activated Calleri's buyout clause, and he signed a contract running until December 2025.

International career

Due to his impressive performances with Boca Juniors and São Paulo, Calleri earned a call-up to the Argentina Olympic squad for the 2016 Summer Olympics. On 29 July 2016, Calleri made his Argentina Olympic debut in a friendly against Mexico, which resulted in a 0–0 draw.

Personal life
Calleri is the nephew of Argentine former footballer Néstor Fabbri.

Career statistics

Honours
Boca Juniors
Primera División: 2015
Copa Argentina: 2014–15

Notes

References

External links 

1993 births
Living people
Footballers from Buenos Aires
Argentine people of Italian descent
Argentine footballers
Association football forwards
Argentine Primera División players
All Boys footballers
Boca Juniors footballers
Deportivo Maldonado players
Campeonato Brasileiro Série A players
São Paulo FC players
Premier League players
West Ham United F.C. players
La Liga players
UD Las Palmas players
Deportivo Alavés players
RCD Espanyol footballers
CA Osasuna players
Footballers at the 2016 Summer Olympics
Olympic footballers of Argentina
Argentina youth international footballers
Argentine expatriate footballers
Argentine expatriate sportspeople in Brazil
Argentine expatriate sportspeople in England
Argentine expatriate sportspeople in Spain
Expatriate footballers in Brazil
Expatriate footballers in England
Expatriate footballers in Spain